519 East 11th Street is a former tenement building in New York City's East Village. It has some architectural similarities to the nearby Eldridge Street Synagogue. Following abandonment of the building in the 1970s, a group of tenants organized themselves and applied for funding through Federal and municipal programs to take ownership of the building in return repayment of a 30-year loan and for sweat equity work to rehabilitate the building.

History 
In 1974, a group purchased 519 East 11th Street from New York City for $100 per unit, under the Division of Alternative Management Program and with assistance from the Urban Homesteading Assistance Board, and received a $177,000 low-interest loan from the city to aid with repairs. Tenants were able to become co-owners of the building by purchasing units at $500 from the group that purchased the building, or by putting in equivalent sweat equity. The building included eleven units in a total of 10,410 square feet.

They installed solar panels to assist with heating, in 1976. Charles Copeland was hired by the tenants to oversee the project of installing solar heating.

Windmill 
519 East 11th Street became famous for the windmill constructed on its roof, designed to provide power for the building. It had the phrase "El Movimiento de la Calle Once:" The 11th Street movement" written on its tail blade. This windmill was constructed with the assistance of Windworks, a renewable energy company created with the support of Buckminster Fuller.

Excess energy, beyond what was consumed by tenants in the building, was pushed back onto Con Edison's grid by causing the meter to run backwards; as a result, the building was sued by Con Edison. Under volunteer representation from Ramsey Clark, the Public Service Commissioner ruled in favor of the tenants. This ruling played a key role in creation of the Public Utility Regulatory Policies Act (PURPA) in 1978. Ed Koch, and Robert and Lola Redford, visited the building to see the famed windmill. The MacNeil/Lehrer Report filmed an episode of its show on the roof of the building, to showcase the windmill.

The windmill was credited with powering the building through the 1977 blackout, even while the surrounding neighborhood lost power. The windmill only functioned for a few years, because it was difficult to maintain.

See also 
 Urban Homesteading Assistance Board

External links 
 Image of 519 East 11th Street at the Museum of the City of New York

References 

DIY culture
Renewable energy
Housing in New York City
Condominiums and housing cooperatives in New York (state)